Count On Me may refer to:

Albums and EPs
 Count On Me (album), by Judah Kelly, 2017
 Count On Me, an album by Julie Grant, 1994
 Count On Me, an album by Robin Meade, 2013
 Count On Me (EP), an EP by Jay Park

Songs
 "Count On Me" (Bruno Mars song), 2011
"Count On Me" (Chase & Status song), featuring Moko, 2013
 "Count On Me" (Jefferson Starship song), 1978
 "Count On Me" (Judah Kelly song), 2017
 "Count On Me" (The Statler Brothers song), 1986
 "Count On Me" (Whitney Houston and CeCe Winans song), 1996
 "Count On Me", a song first sung by Frank Sinatra for the 1949 film, On the Town
 "Count On Me", a song by Fra Lippo Lippi from The Colour Album
 "Count On Me", a song by Default from the album One Thing Remains
 "Count On Me", a song by Glenn Campbell from the album Rhinestone Cowboy
 "Count On Me", a song by Gorilla Zoe from the album Welcome to the Zoo
 "Count On Me", a song by Los Kumbia Kings from the album 4
 "Count On Me", a demo song by Alan Menken for Disney's film Aladdin from album The Music Behind the Magic

See also
 You Can Count On Me (disambiguation)